B. Ravi Pillai  (born 2 September 1953) is a Dubai-based Indian billionaire businessman. He is the founder and chairman of the RP Group. As of September 2021, his net worth is estimated at US$2.5 billion.

Early life
Ravi Pillai  was born on 2 September 1953 at Chavara, a coastal town in Kollam, in the state of Kerala in kadappa pillaiveetil family of farmers. He has a degree in Commerce from Cochin University.

Career
During his time at university, he launched his first business, a chit fund in Kollam on reportedly borrowed money. Later, he started an engineering contract business and worked for some of the major industrial houses in Kerala such as Fertilisers and Chemicals Travancore Limited, Hindustan Newsprint Limited, and Cochin Refineries. However, a labour strike forced him to close down his business, after which he went to Saudi Arabia in 1978 where he started a small trading business. Two years later, he moved into construction, and established Nasser S. Al Hajri Corporation (NSH) with 150 employees, which has over the years grown to become the flagship company of his business group, RP Group, which is known to employ over 70,000 employees across its businesses. The shopping mall in South Kerala, RP Mall at Kollam city is owned by Pillai.

Pillai has expanded his business to other countries including United Arab Emirates, Qatar, and Bahrain, and has interests in construction, hospitality, steel, cement, and oil and gas industries. RP Group is known to hold stakes in hotels such as Leela Kovalam, Hotel Raviz, Kollam, and WelcomHotel Raviz Kadavu, Kozhikode in his home state of Kerala. He is involved in health care through Upasana Hospital and Research Centre, a 300-bed multispecialty hospital in Kollam.,

Awards and recognition
Pillai received an honorary doctorate from Excelsior College, New York, and was awarded the Pravasi Bharatiya Samman by the Government of India in 2008. In 2010, the Government of India included him in the Republic Day honours list for the civilian honour of Padma Shri.

Arabian Business ranked him as the fourth most powerful Indian in the Middle East in 2015.

Personal life
Ravi Pillai is married to Geetha, and they live in Dubai, United Arab Emirates. They have two children, a son Ganesh Ravi Pillai, and a daughter Dr. Arathi Ravi Pillai.

The wedding was organized by the production designer who worked on the film, Baahubali: The Beginning., and is considered the most expensive wedding in Kerala to date. His son Ganesh Pillai married Anjana Suresh, an engineer, in September 2021.

References

1953 births
Living people
Recipients of the Padma Shri in trade and industry
Businesspeople from Kerala
Indian chief executives
Indian expatriates in the United Arab Emirates
People from Kollam district
Indian billionaires
20th-century Indian businesspeople
Recipients of Pravasi Bharatiya Samman